Stade du Hainaut is a multi-use stadium in Valenciennes, France. It is used mostly for football matches and hosts the home matches of Valenciennes FC. It has replaced the Stade Nungesser as VAFC's home stadium. The stadium has a capacity of 25,172 spectators for football matches, but its capacity can be extended to 35,000 for concerts. The stadium is one of the venues for the 2019 FIFA Women's World Cup. It hosted 4 group games, a Round of 16 match, and a quarter-final match.

The stadium was constructed at a total cost of 75 million euros. It contains 2,600 club seats and 16 luxury boxes. It has two giant video screens, each 48 square meters in size. Its roof contains 1,800 tons of steel.

Grand opening
The stadium's grand opening occurred on the evening of 26 July 2011, for a friendly football match between Valenciennes FC and Borussia Dortmund. The visitors prevailed 1–0 before a club-record crowd of 22,778.

Competitions
The stadium hosted the 2019 FIFA Women's World Cup.

References

External links
Team announcement

Football venues in France
Sport in Valenciennes
Sports venues in Nord (French department)
Sports venues completed in 2008
Buildings and structures in Valenciennes
2019 FIFA Women's World Cup stadiums
21st-century architecture in France